Francisco Javier Flores Ibarra (born 17 January 1994) is a Mexican professional footballer who last played for Atlante. He is used mainly used as a right-back.

Career

Cruz Azul

Flores began his football career with Cruz Azul. after his participation in the 2011 FIFA U-17 World Cup coach Enrique Meza saw potential in Flores to play him in the first team. Flores played two games with Cruz Azul during the 2012 Copa Libertadores

Flores made his professional debut for Cruz Azul March 31, 2012 in a home game vs San Luis in a 3–1 win. He came in as a substitute for Gerardo Flores in the 84' minute of the game.

International

Mexico U-17

In 2011, Flores was chosen by coach Raúl Gutiérrez to be part of the Mexican squad that would host the 2011 FIFA U-17 World Cup. He played every single game in the tournament as a first choice right-back.

U-17 International appearances

Mexico U-20
In 2012, Flores was selected to represent Mexico at the 2012 Milk Cup held in Northern Ireland. Mexico made it to the final against Denmark and won 3–0.

In 2013, Flores was selected again by coach Sergio Almaguer to be part of the Mexican squad participating in the 2013 CONCACAF U-20 Championship held in Puebla, Mexico. He played every single match in the tournament and scored a goal versus Jamaica in the tournament.

Flores was a squad member at the 2013 Toulon Tournament and played three out of four matches, in the tournament they were placed sixth out of ten.

Flores participated in the 2013 FIFA U-20 World Cup.

U-20 International appearances

U-20 International Goals

|-
|align=center| 1. || February 27, 2013 || Estadio Cuauhtémoc, Puebla, Mexico ||  || align=center|4–0|| align=center| 2–0 || 2013 CONCACAF U-20 Championship
|-
|}

Honours
Cruz Azul
Copa MX: Clausura 2013

Pachuca
Liga MX: Clausura 2016

Mexico U17
FIFA U-17 World Cup: 2011

Mexico U20
Milk Cup: 2012
CONCACAF U-20 Championship: 2013

References

External links
 
 
 

1994 births
Living people
Footballers from Mexico City
Association football fullbacks
Mexican footballers
Mexico youth international footballers
Mexico under-20 international footballers
C.D. Guadalajara footballers
Cruz Azul footballers
Coras de Nayarit F.C. footballers
Atlante F.C. footballers
C.D. Veracruz footballers
Liga MX players
Ascenso MX players